Hickory Township may refer to:

Arkansas
 Hickory Township, Carroll County, Arkansas

Illinois
 Hickory Township, Schuyler County, Illinois

Kansas
 Hickory Township, Butler County, Kansas

Minnesota
 Hickory Township, Pennington County, Minnesota

Missouri
 Hickory Township, Holt County, Missouri, in Holt County, Missouri

North Carolina
 Hickory Township, Catawba County, North Carolina, in Catawba County, North Carolina

Pennsylvania
 Hickory Township, Forest County, Pennsylvania
 Hickory Township, Lawrence County, Pennsylvania
 Hickory Township, Mercer County, now the city of Hermitage, Pennsylvania

Township name disambiguation pages